The Dominican Republic is divided into three macro-regions, which are in turn divided into ten regions.

In 1858 the country was divided in 3 departments: Cibao (North), Ozama (Southwest), and Seybo (Southeast).

References 

 
Dominican Republic, Regions
Dominican Republic 0
Regions
Geographical regions
Regions of the Caribbean
Geography of the Dominican Republic